The Banū Khuzāʿah ( singular  Khuzāʿī) is the name of an Azdite, Qaḥṭānite tribe, which is one of the main ancestral tribes of the Arabian Peninsula. They ruled Mecca for a long period, prior to the Islamic prophet Muhammad's rule, and many members of the tribe now live in and around that city, but are also present in significant numbers in other countries, mainly Iraq, Palestine, and Jordan but also numbers can be found in Lebanon, Egypt, Libya, Syria, Qatar, Bahrain, Kuwait and UAE. The tribe acted as the custodians of Mecca before the Quraysh. They were the ruling kings of the Emirate of what is now modern-day Iraq, until the invasion of the Ottoman Empire in the late 1800s and were the rulers of the kingdom of the Middle Euphrates until the early-mid 20th century.

During Muhammad's era

They participated in the Battle of the Trench. The Banu Nadir began rousing the nomads of Najd. The Nadir enlisted the Banu Ghatafan by paying them half of their harvest. This contingent, the second largest, added a strength of about 2,000 men and 300 horsemen led by Unaina bin Hasan Fazari. The Bani Assad also agreed to join, led by Tuleha Asadi. From the Banu Sulaym, the Nadir secured 700 men, though this force would likely have been much larger had not some of its leaders been sympathetic towards Islam. The Bani Amir, who had a pact with Muhammad, refused to join.

Other tribes included the Banu Murra, with 400 men led by Hars ibn Auf Murri, and the Banu Shuja, with 700 men led by Sufyan ibn Abd Shams. In total, the strength of the Confederate armies, though not agreed upon by scholars, is estimated to have included around 10,000 men and six hundred horsemen. At the end of March 627 the army, which was led by Abu Sufyan, marched on Medina.

In accordance with the plan the armies began marching towards Medina, Meccans from the south (along the coast) and the others from the east. At the same time horsemen from the Banu Khuza'a left to warn Medina of the invading army.

The Lineage of Banū Khuzā'ah

Most traditionalists trace the origins of the tribe to Amr ibn Luḥay al-Khuzā'ī, and agree that, with the other branches of the Azd, they at some point, left Yemen and moved north. 'Amr ibn Luḥay and his clan settled themselves around Mecca.  A date of around the 5th century can be set for that settlement, although traditionalists place it at an earlier date by giving particularly long lives to some of its leaders.

The opinions of genealogists vary concerning the ancestry and origins of the Banu Khuza'ah; some say that they were descended from Qahtan and others say they are from Adnan. We will present both opinions here:

The first group 

Al-Mubarrid was of the opinion that Khuzā’ah are descendants of ‘Amr bin Rabī’ah, and he was known as Luḥay and belonged to the Azd; Ibn al-Athīr al-Jazarī agrees with him, saying: “They were called Khuzā’ah because they broke away from the Azd when they all left Yemen at the time of the flood of ˁIram” (the breach of the Ma’rib dam). Yāqūt al-Ḥamawī says the same, but states that they are Qaḥṭānites. Al-Qalqashandī states: “Khuzā’ah are a tribe from the Azd, from the Qaḥṭānites.”

Ibn ‘Abd al-Birr states that ibn al-Kalbī was of the opinion that:” 'Amr bin Luḥay, for Luḥay was his name, is Rabī’ah ibn Ḥārithah bin ‘Amr; and he is Mā’ al-Samā’ ibn Ḥārithah bin Imra’ al-Qays bin Tha’labah bin Māzin bin al-Azd bin Ghawth bin al-Nābit bin Mālik bin Zayd bin Kaḥlān bin Saba’ bin Yashjab bin Ya’rab bin Qaḥṭān, so he is the ancestor of all of Khuzā’ah, and they broke away from him."

It is suggested that one of the strongest proofs for this is that the Khuzā’ah themselves used to say: “We are the sons of ‘Amr ibn Rabī’ah from the Yemen.”

Arabs linguists tended towards the opinion that the name of Khuzā’ah came from the phrase: khaza’a ‘an aṣḥābihi (خزع عن أصحابه ), which means "he has lagged behind his companions (when they are walking)"; so they were called this because they were behind their people when they came from Ma’rib.

Al-Zabīdī mentions what ‘Awn ibn Ayūb al-Ansārī stated:
فَلَمَّا هَبَطْنَا بَطْنَ مُرٍّ تَخَزَعَتْ    خُزَاعَةٌ عَنّا فِيْ حُلُوْلِ كَرَاكِرَ (Fa-lammā habaṭnā baṭna murrin takhazza'at    khuzā’atun ‘annā fī ḥulūli Karākira : "And when we dismounted at Baṭn Murr Khuzā'ah had already stayed behind in the camp at Karākir.")

It is said that ascribing Khuzā’ah to Qaḥṭān also agrees with this etymology of the name, whereas to say that they are descendants of ‘Adnān makes such an etymology of the name meaningless.

The second group

Ibn Iṣḥaq is of the opinion that Khuzā’ah are the descendants of ‘Amr ibn Luḥay bin Qum’ah bin Ilyās bin Muḑar bin Nazār bin Ma’d bin ‘Adnān; they would therefore be Muḑarites rather than Qaḥṭanites. Al-Muṣ’ab al-Zubayri also agrees with Ibn Iṣḥaq, saying that Qum’ah is ‘Umayr, father of Khuzā’ah. This is supported by the opinion of Ibn Ḥazm, who related four prophetic traditions (Ḥadīth) substantiating that Khuzā’ah were from Muḑar and not from Qaḥṭān:

Ḥadīth 1: From Abū Hurayrah that Muhammad said: “’Amr ibn Luḥay bin Qum’ah bin Khandaf is the father of Khuzā’ah.”

Ḥadīth 2: The statement of Muhammad: “I saw ‘Amr bin Luḥay bin Qum’ah bin Khandaf the father of those sons of Ka’b, and he was dragging his intestines through hellfire.”  And those sons of Ka’b are the ones about whom Ibn 'Abbās said: “The Quran was sent down in the dialect of Ka’bs: Ka’b bin Ka’b bin Lu’ayy and Ka’b bin 'Amr bin Luḥay.”

Ḥadīth 3: The narration of Aktham ibn Abī Ḥabbūn al-Khuzā’ī, when Muhammad said to him, “O Aktham! I saw Rabī’ah ibn Luḥay bin Qum’ah bin Khandaf dragging his intestines in the fire, and I have never seen any man more like him than you; nor more like you than him.” Aktham asked: “Are you afraid that being like him will harm me, o Messenger of Allah?” And he replied: ”No, you are a believer and he was an unbeliever …”  And al-Muṣ’ab al-Zubayrī stood by this ḥadīth saying that whatever Muhammad said was the truth. This is also supported by Ibn Khaldūn, who reiterates the statement of Qādi ‘Ayyāḑ: ”What is well known about this Khuzā’ah is that he is ‘Amr bin Luḥay bin Qum’ah bin Ilyās.

Ḥadīth 4: The ḥadīth of Salamah ibn al-Akwā', who said: “The Messenger of Allah (SAW) passed by a group of people from the tribe of Aslam who were practicing archery.“ And he said to them: ”Throw Banī Ismā’īl, for your father was an archer, and I am with the sons of such-and-such a one …”

Ibn Ḥazm said: “Now as for the first, the third and the fourth ḥadīths, they are all extremely authentic and reliable, and they cannot be rejected for the statements of the genealogists and others; and on the basis of these Khuzā’ah was one of the sons of Qum’ah bin Ilyās bin Muḑar.

Al-Suhaylī said that the ḥadīth of Salamah was a strong proof for those who considered Khuzā’ah to be one of the sons of Qum’ah ibn Ilyās.  And there is not the slightest doubt that the difference between the different genealogists stems from the fact that Salamah mentioned in the fourth Ḥadīth are the brothers of Khuzā’ah. And among the some more modern scholars who prefer to regard Khuzā’ah as one of the descendants of ‘Adnān is 'Allāmah ‘Abd al-Raḥmān bin Yaḥyā al-Mu’allamī al-Yamānī.

Phratries (buṭūn)

In ancient times the tribe of Khuzā’ah was subdivided into a number of phratries (buṭūn):

Banū Kalb bin 'Amr
Banū Salūl bin 'Amr
Banū Ḥabshah bin Salūl
Banū Qumayr bin Ḥabshah
Banū Ḑāṭar bin Ḥabshah
Banū Ḥalīl bin Ḥabshah
Banū Kulayb bin Ḥabshah
Banū ˁAddī bin Salūl
Banū Ḥabtar bin ˁAddī
Banū Haynah bin ˁAddī
Banū Ḥabshah bin Ka'b
Banū Ḥarām bin Ḥabshah
Banū Ghāḑirah bin Ḥabshah
Banū Sa'd bin Ka'b
Banū Māzin bin Ka'b
Banū ˁAddī bin 'Amr
Banū Malīḥ bin 'Amr: It is said that among them was Quraysh, one of the sons of al-Ṣalt bin Mālik bin al-Naḑar bin Kinānah"
Banū 'Awf bin 'Amr
Banū Naḑr bin 'Awf
"Banū Jufnah bin 'Awf; and they were in al-Ḥīrah.
Banū Sa'd bin 'Amr"
Banū al-Muṣṭaliq bin Sa'd;the name of al-Muṣṭaliq was Judhaymah.
Banū al-Ḥayā' bin Sa'd; and the name of al-Ḥayā' was 'Amr

And Banū al-Muṣṭaliq and Banū al-Ḥayā’ belong to the tribes who formed the Ḥalaf of Ḥabābish in Makkah.

Tribes with closest lineage

The closest tribes in lineage to Khuzā’ah are the Ansar (Aws & Khazraj) and Bariq, Ghassān and Dawasir (Al-Zayed) all of them are from Azd Mazin tribes .

Camp sites and settlements

Geographical and historical works mention the locations that Khuzā’ah used to inhabit before and after the coming of Islam, since they were either Makkah, or adjoining it or in the mountains, watering holes and wadis around it.  A number of other Arab tribes used to share these places with them, such as the Quraysh in Makkah, and Kinānah in Jabal al-Abwā’ and Murr al-Ẓahrān and Qudayd. The Arab tribes in general often used to move from one area to another in search of water, something that sometimes led to tribes sharing certain spots. And among the campsites of Khuza’ah were:

 Murr al-Ẓahrān
 'Asifān
 Qudayd
 Al-Watīr
 Al-Maraysī’
 Khalīṣ
 Ghazzāl
 Ghaḑūr
 Ghalā’il
 Al-Ghurābāt
 Ghadīr Khumm
 Muhaymah (al-Juḥfah)
 Al-Abwā’
 Muḥammar
 Shanā’iq
 Shaqrā
 Al-Shabbāk
 Dawrān
 Khayf Salām
 Khayf al-Ni’am
 Nadā
 Nashāq
 Al-Mashqar
 Amaj
 Shahad
 ‘Abab
 Shamnaṣīr
 Harshī
 Bayyin

History

Rule of the Banu Khuza'ah over Mecca

After Hājar (Hagar of the Bible), the wife of the Ibrāhīm (Abraham) and their son Ismā’īl (Ishmael) had settled in Mecca, the tribe of Jurhum,  happened to pass through there and agreed with Hājar that they should remain there as a new spring of fresh water had emerged at that location. They settled in Mecca and in the area around. Once Ismā’īl had become a youth he married a woman of the tribe of Jurhum. Ismā’īl was the custodian of the Sacred House (Ka’bah), and after he died he made his son Nābit his successor. And then after Nābit the job was given to his uncles from Jurhum, and with them were the descendants of Ismā’īl. Then Muḑāḑah ibn 'Amr al-Jurhamī assumed the burden of the affairs of the Sacred House.

Jurhum's custodianship of the Sanctuary lasted for a period of time, but they then started to become weaker in faith, putting the continuing sanctity of the Sacred House at peril. They considered all the funds collected at the Sanctuary to be their property, and started to perform sinful acts within its precincts. It came to the point where a man and a woman, called Asāf and Nā’ilah, performed coitus in the Sacred House, and according to the Muslim sources Allah turned them into two stones to punish them for this sacrilegious act.

Their aggression against the sanctity of the Sanctuary was the catalyst that made the Banū Bakr bin ‘Abd al-Manāf bin Kinānah, descendants of Ismā’īl, join with Khuzā’ah in fighting Jurhum and they expelled them from Mecca.

After the Jurhumites had fled, Khuzā’ah became custodians of the Sacred House, passing the duty on from father to son for a long time, five hundred years it is said. The first one of Khuzā’ah to govern the Sacred House was ‘Amr bin Rabī’ah (Luḥay) who travelled to Syria-Palestine (al-Shām) to seek a cure for a disease he was suffering from; he found the people there worshiping idols, and he liked this religion, so he brought back an idol called Hubal back to Mecca and called on the people to worship it. Hubal had the figure of an old man with a long beard and was made of carnelian. Its right hand had been cut off but the Quraysh would later provide it with a hand made of gold. 'Amr ibn Rabī'ah then was the first to change the religion of the Arabs. Muslims historians consider that the people of Mecca were following the monotheistic religion of Ibrāhīm and Ismā'īl up to this point (see Hanif), when polytheism was introduced. 'Amr ibn Luḥay became very famous among the other Arab tribes, because he fed all the pilgrims to the Sacred House, and distributed Yemeni cloaks to them. Many of the tribes started to visit Mecca on pilgrimage, and took their own idols with them, placing them around the Ka'bah to worship.

It is narrated that Banū Qays ‘Aylān bin MuDar coveted the Sacred House and they came one day in a great mass, accompanied by some other tribes, with the intention of seizing it. At that time the leader of Banū Qays ‘Aylān was ‘Amr ibn al-Zarb al-'Udwānī.  Khuzā’ah went out to fight them, and a battled ensued, and finally the Banū Qays ‘Aylān fled.

Similarly a group of the Hawāzin also launched a raid on the Banū Ḑāṭir bin Ḥabshah, one of the Banū Khuzā'ah, just after the Hawāzin had attacked the Banū Malūḥ (who belonged to Kinānah); then the Banū Ḑāṭir and a group of Khuzā'ah raided the Hawāzin and killed many men. On another occasion the Hawazin raided Khuza'ah, and the fought at al-MaHSab near Mina; they succeeded in beating the Banu 'Unqa' and some of the Banu DaTir from Khuza'ah. During this time the Khuza'ah tribe controlled the region from the West of Madina to the Red Sea.

Passing control of Mecca to Quraysh

Quraysh, the descendants of al-Naḑr bin Kinānah, were dispersed at that time both in Mecca and the surrounding area. This changed when Quṣay bin Kilāb got betrothed to Hubay bint Ḥalīl bin Ḥabshah bin Salūl bin Ka’b bin ‘Amr al-Khuzā’ī; he married her and at that time her father was in charge of the Ka’bah, so Quṣay was later able to take over the custody of the Sanctuary. There are three different versions of the story of how Quṣay managed to seize this custody:

1. Ibn Isḥaq states that Quṣay became wealthy, his sons were dispersed all over Mecca, and he was held in great respect. After the death of Ḥalīl, Qusay thought he had more right to govern Mecca than Khuzā’ah, since the tribe of Quraysh were the cream of the sons of Ismā’īl son of Ibrāhīm and he was their pure descendant. The sons of Kinānah and Quraysh joined together to help him to expel Khuzā’ah and Banū Bakr from Mecca. He sent a message to is stepbrother, Razāḥ bin Rabī’ah, asking him to assist, and he did indeed come. Razāḥ rushed to Mecca with his tribe from Quḑā’ah, to help his brother in the war against Khuzā’ah.

2. Al-Azraqī mentions that Ḥalil liked Quṣay, and gave him his daughter's hand during his lifetime. Quṣay became the father of ‘Abd al-Dār, ‘Abd Manāf and ‘Abd al-‘Uzzā among others. Now when Ḥalīl became old he used to give the key of the Ka’bah to his daughter, and she would pass it to her husband to open up the Sacred House. When Ḥalīl was dying he considered the fact that Quṣay had so many offspring and that they were well established, and he bequeathed him control of the Sanctuary, giving him the key. Now when Khuza’ah found out about this they refused to give the control of the Sacred House to Quṣay, and they took the key from Hubay. Now Quṣay quickly went to his people the Quraysh and Banu Kinānah and sought their help against Khuzā’ah, and he also sent for his brother to come from the territory of Quḑa’ah to assist.

3. Abu Hilāl al-‘Askerī relates that when Ḥalīl became old, he passed control of the Sacred House to Abū Ghabshān Salīm bin ‘Amr al-Khuzā’ī, and one day he and Quṣay were drinking together; now when he became drunk Quṣay bought the control of the Sacred House from him for a skinful of wine and a young camel. As a result there was a saying: “More damaging than the transaction of Abū Ghabshān.”
These individual accounts when collated show that Qusay was getting ready to seize the Sacred House from Khuza’ah, and Khuza’ah set out to fight Quṣay, Quraysh, Kinānah and his allies from Quḑaa’ah. There was a fierce battle which was known as “The Day of Abṭaḥ” (Yawm Abṭaḥ); there were many casualties on both sides but the army of Quṣay was victorious. Finally both sides decided that they should seek a ruling about what to do; they consulted the leader of Banu Kinānah, Ya’mar bin ‘Awf bin Ka’b bin ‘Āmir bin Layth bin Bakr bin ‘Abd Manāt bin Kinānah, and he decide that Quṣay should forget all the injuries sustained by him and his men, and that in recompense for the blood of Khuzā’ah spilled by Quṣay’s army blood money was due; but however Khuza’ah should pass on the rule of Mecca to Quṣay. This event occurred in the 5th century CE.

The Khuzā'ah remained allies of the Quraysh and in 570, the Year of the Elephant, took part in the battle against Abrahah.

In 630, the Khuzā'ah were attacked by the Banū Bakr, allies of the Quraysh. Since the Khuzā'ah had recently formed an alliance with Muḥammad ( referred to in the Qur'an, this attack constituted a breach of the Treaty of Ḥudaybīyah of 628, that had brought about a truce between the Muslims and the Quraish and forbade hostilities between the two groups and their respective allies. This led to the conquest of Mecca by the Muslim armies, which occurred without a battle.

The Banū Mustaliq was a branch of Banū Khuzā'ah. They occupied the territory of Qudayd on the Red Sea shore between Jeddah and Rābigh.

Connection with the genealogy of Muḥammad

The genealogy of Muhammad is connected to that of Khuzā’ah in two ways: firstly by way of his third great grandfather ‘Abd Manāf bin Qusay; and also through his marriage to the ‘Mother of the Believers’ Juwayrīyah, daughter of al-Ḥārith al-Khuzā’ī.

Role in the conquest of Mecca

At the time of the Truce of Ḥudaybiyah one of the conditions set down was: ”Whoever wishes to enter into an agreement with Muhammad and into his covenant then he should enter it; and whoever wishes to enter into an agreement with the Quraysh and into their covenant then he should enter it.” And Khuzā’ah leaped up with enthusiasm, saying: “We are in agreement with Muḥamamd and in his covenant!” While the Banū al-Di’l bin Bakr jumped up saying: “We are in agreement with the Quraysh and in their covenant!”

Quraysh break the truce

Now while the truce was still holding the Banū al-Di’l bin Bakr took advantage of it, and wanted to take blood revenge from Khuzā’ah for something that had happened in the Pre-Islamic period; they surprised them at a watering hole belonging to Khuzā’ah at al-Watīr to the south of Mecca, and they killed twenty of their men. They were helped in this attack by Quraysh who supplied men and weapons; and Khuzā'ah were driven into the Sacred Territory (Ḥaram), where they were unable to continue fighting.

Khuzā’ah seeks the aid of Muḥammad 

‘Amr bin Sālim al-Khuzā’ī set out with forty mounted men of Khuzā’ah to go to Muḥammad in order to tell him what had happened to them. And when Muhammad was among the people in the mosque, ‘Amr recited a poem to him about the agreements and affiliations between them and Khuzā'ah.

Muḥammad assists Khuzā’ah and conquers Mecca

Then Muḥammad said: “You have our help, O ‘Amr ibn Sālim!” And he looked towards a cloud in the sky, saying: “This will make the victory of the Banū Ka’b easy!”

Nawfil ibn Mu’āwiyah al-Di’lī al-Kinānī apologized for his people saying: “The riders are lying to you.” But Muḥammad said: “Never mind about the riders. We have nobody, whether close relatives or not close, in Tihāmah who has been better with us than Khuzā’ah!”  Then he continued: “I would not receive succor if I failed to assist Banū Ka’b from the very thing in which I need help.”  Muḥammad coordinated a large coalition force including Muslims and some of the Bedouin tribes and they went to Mecca and conquered it. This was towards the end of January 630 CE (8 AH).

Modern day

Many descendants of the tribe still live in their original homeland, in the Kingdom of Saudi Arabia, but many members of the tribe live in other countries, such as Palestine, Iraq, Qatar, Bahrain and Jordan.

In Saudi Arabia
 Khuzā’ah in the Holy city of Mecca: in Wādī Fāṭimah and what used to be known as Wādī Ẓahrān):
Dhawī al-Mafraḥ
Dhawī al-Harazi
Dhawī Maddah
Dhawī Mahdī
Dhawī Ḥāmid
Dhawī Muḥammad
 Khuzā’ah of the open country (Wādī Malkān)

Al-Talḥah, and they are subdivided into:
Āl Sirāj
Āl ‘Awwāḑ (al-Maṭrān and Āl Turkī)
Al-Ḥanashah
(Āl Radād) al-Sawālimah
Al-Qawāsiyah
 Āl Mash’āb (and they are the sons of ibn Sadaqah)
Āl bin Rashīd
 Al-Shimārīn, and they are divided into:
Āl Ghaṭaysh
Āl Mubārak (among them are Āl Marzūq)
Āl ‘Awād
Āl ‘Āyad
Āl ‘Alī (al-Ghuraybah)

 Khuzā’ah of the Sea (Baḥrah)
Al-Saqāriyah

Khuzā’ah of Tihāmah ‘Asīr
 Al-Munjiḥah (al-Munjiḥī) (their homes are in al-Qumḥah on the coast of Tihāmah, between al-Barq and Shaqīq; among their villages are in al-Khashāfah, Dhahbān and al-Fattāḥ; and one of their watering places (mawārid) is al-Qu’r.) They include:
Amkharīṣ (Kharīṣ)
Al-‘Abdīyah
Āl Zayd
Umm Muḥāwish (Muḥāwish)
Āl Saryāḥ
Al-Ma’yūf
Al-Shahbī
Wuld Islām
Umm Muḥmaḑī
Am’awaḑ
Al-Raws
Amqub’ah
 Al-Rīsh: and their dwellings are in Tihāmah, north-east of Maḥayal ‘Asīr.
Khuzā'ah of Al-Aḥsā Province.
Al-Ramaḑān
Āl 'Abd al-Salām
Āl Ḥawāj(al-Ḥawāj)

In Iraq

 Al Kazale (another way of spelling Khazāˁil)
 Al-Khazāˁil
Āl Ṣaqar
Āl Ḥāj ‘Abdullāh
Āl Shabīb bin Salmān
Āl Ḥāj Muḥsin bin Salmān
Āl Dāwūd bin Salmān
Āl Ghānim bin Salmān
Āl Karnūṣ bin Salmān
Āl Darwīsh bin Salmān
Āl Danyūs bin Salmān
Āl ‘Ajrash bin Salmān
Āl Kahw bin Salmān
Āl Jassās bin Salmān
‘Ashīrahs of Āl Ḥamd bin ‘Abbās al-Khuzā’ī.
Albū Ḥamd
Albū Muḥammad
Albū Jaffāl
Āl ‘Abbās
Āl ‘Abdullāh
Āl Ḥusayn
Āl Sa’dūn
Āl Suwayd
The ‘Ashirahs of Salmān al-Awwal al-Khuzā’ī
Āl Ḥamūdī
Āl Hilāl
Āl Ya’qūb
 ‘Ashīrahs of Āl Mihnā including al-Ḥays bin Salmān al-Awwal
Āl Mihnā
Albū al-Dīn
Albū Khazˁal
Albū Khuḑayr
Āl Qadarī
Āl Shams
Āl Rashīd
 ‘Ashīrahs of Āl Māni’ Maqṭa’ al-Ru’ūs bin Muḥsin bin Jundayl
Albū Ḥalīl
Albū Kandaj
Albū ‘Ibādī
‘Ashīrahs of Āl Ramaḑān bin Salmān al-Awwal
Al-Ramaḑān: and they live mainly in the countries of the Persian Gulf.
Āl ‘Imrān al-Ramaḑān (living in Baghdad)
 The ‘Ashīrah of the Āl Juwaykh bin Salmān al-Awwal al-Khuzā’ī
Āl Juwaykh in al-NāSiriyah
 The ‘Ashīrah of Āl Fāris bin Salmān al-Awwal al-Khuzā’ī.
Āl Marzah (living in Najd and Baghdad)
 The ‘Ashīrah of al-Ḥamāḥimah, descendants of Ḥāmī bin Muḥammad bin Mahnā bin Ismā’īl bin Salmān al-Awwal al-Khuzā’ī.
Āl Dāwūd
Āl Shāhir
Abū Shakīlah
Āl Lāyadh
Hamid Bin Hamoud Alkhouzai was the ruler, King and Emir of Southern Iraq.

In Jordan

 Al-Rousān
 Al-Duwayk (Al Duwek or Al Doweik)
 Al-Khuzāˁilah in the central and northern deserts (bādiyah).
 Al-Khuzā’ī
 Al-Buṣūl in northern Jordan
 Al-Kūfaḥī in the area of al-Bāriḥah
 Al-Farīḥāt, and among them id the Shaykh Rāshid al-Khuzā’ī
 Āl Ḥarfūsh (al-Ḥarāfishah)
 Āl Ḥarfūsh (al-Ḥarāfishah) in Wādī al-Sarḥān
 Āl Ḥarfūsh (al-Ḥarāfishah) in al-Mafraq.

In Palestine

 Āl Quydayḥ, among them:
 Āl ‘Alī
Āl Subḥ
Āl Ruḑwān
Āl Rajīlah
Āl Rūk
 Al-Duwaykāt
 Āl Najjār
Āl Shanīnū
Āl Jāmūs
 Āl Ḥarfūsh: al-Ḥarāfishah, and among them are Ṣāfī and Zayd and ‘Īsā ‘Nakhlah’, sons of the Emir Salām bin Ḥarfūsh, originally from the village of Bayt Nabālah.
Abū Raydah
Al-Qarrā
Āl Ḥarfūsh  - al-Ḥarāfishah ( Kharbatā al-Miṣbāḥ).
Āl Ḥarfūsh – al-Ḥarāfishah (al-Maghār)

In other countries

 Bahrain
 Āl Ramaḑān
 Āl ‘Abd al-Salām
 Āl Ḥawāj  (al-Hawāj)
 Al-Ṭawwāsh
 Bin ‘
 Al-Qaṭṭārah (al-Qaṭarī)
 Al-Khuzā’ī
 Qatar
 Bin ‘Abbās
 Al-Khuzā’ī
 Egypt
 Āl Ḥarfūsh – al-Ḥarāfishah (Banhā)
 Āl Ḥarfūsh – al-Ḥarāfishah (Al-Bakātūsh, Kafar al-Shaykh)
 Kuwait
 Bayt al-‘Arīsh
 Āl ‘Abd al-Salām
 Āl Ramaḑān
 Āl Hawāj (al-Hawāj)
 Lebanon
 Āl Ḥarfūsh – Al-Ḥarāfishah (Baalbek)
 Syria
 Albū ‘Ājūz in Aleppo, they came from Iraq to Syria and all have their written family trees leading back to ‘Amr bin Luḥay.
 America
 There is a large network of members of Khuzā’ah, belonging to the Āl Ḥarfūsh – al-Ḥarāfishah, dating back to the 1920s.

Members
Umm Anmaar
Abdulla Abbas Abdulla Abbas Ali Hussain Al-Khayat

See also 
Tribes of Arabia

References

External links
http://www.witness-pioneer.org/vil/Articles/companion/04_abu_bakr.htm
 Al-Maqhafī, 'Awwād: Qabā'l Wa Butūn Al-'Arab
 Al-Mas'ūdī, 'Abd al-'Azīz: Tārikh Qabā'il Al-'Arab

Azd